Quambone is a locality in New South Wales, Australia. The locality is centred at the junction of roads to Warren, Coonamble and Carinda.

The name derives from a Ngiyampaa word, kuwaympuyan meaning 'having blood'.

It has a hotel/motel, general store and swimming pool, and a public school. It has regular Catholic and Anglican church services.

Doug Moppett, a long-term member of the Parliament of New South Wales,  lived at Quambone.

References

Towns in New South Wales